Gina Keatley (born March 9, 1980) is an American nutritionist, media personality, and television host. She is better known for her food-focused television shows and her approach to health and weight loss. Gina was awarded The President’s Council on Fitness, Sports & Nutrition Community Leadership Award in 2013.

Career 
During her time as a student Keatley received multiple culinary awards from the New York chapter of the American Culinary Federation.

In June 2007 Keatley co-founded and was CEO of Nourishing USA. She spent five years as director of nutrition and culinary arts combating obesity and diabetes in food deserts in New York City. She was nutrition consultant for several partnership organizations including The New York Yankees, where she designed an outreach childhood weight management and wellness program. Delving into urban malnourishment issues and pushing for promotion of personal responsibility for health resulted in Turner Broadcasting naming her a CNN Hero. She was named by L’Oreal as a Woman of Worth. "Special Inspiration Awardee" at the Susan G. Komen Inspirational Awards and a  Wiley College Women of Excellence Awardee.

In 2012, Keatley launched a private nutrition counseling center, Keatley Medical Nutrition Therapy. Gina received The President's Council on Fitness, Sports & Nutrition Community Leadership Award in 2013.

In 2014, Keatley was named one of Collaborate Magazine's 40 Under 40 for her accomplishments as one of the industry's top young professionals. In 2015, Keatley became The American Ambassador of Malaysian Cuisine.

In 2017, Keatley became the Editor-in-chief of Spiralized Magazine  and Creative Director of Tasty Bytes Magazine  and developed the iOS apps Fork Up Phone Down and The Dinner Bell to support healthy eating initiatives.

In December 2017, Keatley became a professor of International Cuisine at Queens College, City University of New York. In May 2018, Keatley facilitated the launch of SIMMER, a tech and food collaboration. In 2018, SIMMER began development of the app Hungry4Halal, a mobile application designed to help users find locations that serve halal cuisine. In January 2022, Gina Keatley became the chief executive officer of the Sicilian Olive Leaf Tea Company and launched Matche, the world's first powdered olive leaf tea at the World Tea Conference and Expo.

Television
Keatley has appeared on a number of cooking programs in the US, including  Food Network's "Extreme Chef". In September 2012, Keatley was a contestant on the tenth season of Top Chef: Seattle. She was featured in a NY Daily News article. In 2013 Keatley was on HLN's "Cook Your Ass Off."

Keatley has appeared on Hallmarks Channel's show Emeril’s Table, The Dr.Oz Show, Good Day New York, The Lisa Oz Show  and BBC World,  and an occasional guest panelist on programs such as TED Talks.

In June 2013, Keatley joined Uncanned Productions team as Host of a new show, Healthy Soul with Gina Keatley. In November 2013, Gina Keatley was highlighted in "Beard Foundation Honors Women in Food" article in Gotham Magazine. In 2014, Keatley was chosen as of one of five celebrity panelists for Glamour And L'Oreal Paris Top Ten College Women Panel.

In 2015, Keatley became a wellness contributing author to The Huffington Post, as well as an expert nutrition source for Yahoo Health. Keatley is executive producer of a food documentary titled Far From Healthy. In 2016 Keatley started filming Deliciously Diverse: Malaysia with Gina Keatley.

In 2017, Amazon Prime premiered Deliciously Diverse Malaysia with Gina Keatley.

Filmography

References

External links
 
 
 Matche Olive Leaf Tea

Living people
Steinhardt School of Culture, Education, and Human Development alumni
People from Massachusetts
American television journalists
American women television journalists
American food writers
American television chefs
American television talk show hosts
Food Network chefs
American cookbook writers
American writers of Italian descent
American chefs
American film actresses
American bloggers
Chefs of Italian cuisine
Writers from New York City
Actresses from New York (state)
American women nutritionists
American nutritionists
American cinematographers
Women cookbook writers
American women bloggers
American women chief executives
American chief executives of food industry companies
American women chefs
American women non-fiction writers
21st-century American non-fiction writers
1980 births
21st-century American actresses